The American Liver Foundation (ALF) is a non-profit organization that promotes liver health and disease prevention. The mission of the ALF is to facilitate, advocate and promote education, support and research for the prevention, treatment, and cure of liver disease.

ALF History 
Although liver disease is among the ten major causes of death in the United States, there was no national voluntary health agency devoted exclusively to combating liver diseases until 1976, when the American Liver Foundation was created by the American Association for the Study of Liver Diseases (AASLD). This organization of scientists and healthcare professionals was concerned with the rising incidence of liver disease and the lack of awareness among both the general public and the medical community. The mission, the programs and the services provided by American Liver Foundation complement the work of AASLD.

Currently, the American Liver Foundation has 16 Divisions across the U.S.

ALF Education Programs 
The liver may be the largest organ in the body, weighing in at 3½ pounds, but it is neither the most popular nor the best understood. So when a diagnosis of liver disease is made, it can be a frightening and confusing time in the lives of many patients and their families.

One of the most powerful ways of maintaining liver health and preventing liver disease is education. Many forms of liver disease are preventable, and many more can be cured if detected early. Yet tens of thousands of people in the U.S. are living with liver disease and do not know it. For this reason, ALF implements a wide range of educational and preventative efforts.

ALF Research Awards 
Research is integral to the work of the American Liver Foundation and is essential to improving, treating and finding a cure for liver disease.
Since 1979, the Research Awards Program has provided more than $26 million in research funding. Over 850 qualified scientists and physicians have pursued careers in liver disease research and treatment as a result of receiving these grants early in their careers.

References

External links 
 Official website

Medical and health foundations in the United States
Non-profit organizations based in New York City
Hepatology organizations